The 1988 Gael Linn Cup, the most important representative competition for elite level participants in the women's team field sport of camogie, was won by Leinster, who defeated Connacht in the final, played at Silver Park Kilmacud.

Arrangements
Leinster extended their unbeaten run in the competition to six years with an 8–9 to 0–2 win over Ulster at Ballyholland, Co. Down, and Connacht surprised Munster 3–10 to 1–7 at Killimor. Leinster defeated Connacht 2–9 to 2–4 in the final at Kilmacud. Connachttook an early lead through Ann Ryan but Leinster took control soon afterwards with goals from Kilkenny's Angela Downey and Breda Holmes and led 2–5 to 0–3 at half time.
Munster won their third successive Gael-Linn Junior Trophy defeating Connacht 3–7 to 1–2 at Killimor and Leinster by 4–3 to 3–5 at Kilmacud.

Final stages

|}

Junior Final

|}

References

External links
 Camogie Association

1988 in camogie
1988